Blue sun may refer to:

A star with a suitable spectral type O
Blue Sun (album), a 1982 album by Ralph Towner
Blue Sun (album), a 2017 album by Jack Nunn on Atlantic Jaxx records 
Blue Sun Corporation, a fictional corporation in the Firefly television series